The Peter Fuller Building is a historic commercial building located at 808 Commonwealth Avenue in Brookline, Massachusetts.

Description and history 
This five-story limestone-faced building occupies a prominent position on Commonwealth Avenue near the south end of the BU Bridge. It was designed by the prolific architect Albert Kahn, a noted designer of industrial buildings, and built in 1927 for the Cadillac Auto Company. It is one of the few Boston-area buildings designed by Kahn, who did extensive work designing automobile-related industrial facilities in the American Midwest. This building stood at what was then a gateway position leading to a row of automotive dealerships along Commonwealth Avenue, and was designed to be a local flagship showroom for the luxury Cadillac line. It gets its name from Peter D. Fuller, president of the Cadillac Automobile Company of Boston. It ceased to be a car showroom in 1978, when Fuller closed his dealership, citing high overhead costs. It was purchased by Boston University the following year. In 2020 the building became home to the Howard Thurman Center, a center for student life at BU.

The building was listed on the National Register of Historic Places on October 17, 1985.

See also
National Register of Historic Places listings in Brookline, Massachusetts

References

Commercial buildings on the National Register of Historic Places in Massachusetts
Neoclassical architecture in Massachusetts
Buildings and structures in Brookline, Massachusetts
National Register of Historic Places in Brookline, Massachusetts

Albert Kahn (architect) buildings
Commercial buildings completed in 1927